The bibliography of Fyodor Dostoyevsky (1821 – 1881) comprises novels, novellas, short stories, essays and other literary works. Raised by a literate family, Dostoyevsky discovered literature at an early age, beginning when his mother introduced the Bible to him. Nannies near the hospitalsin the grounds of which he was raisedintroduced Dostoyevsky to fairy tales, legends and sagas. His mother's subscription to the Library of Reading gave him access to the leading contemporary Russian and non-Russian literature. After his mother's death, Dostoyevsky moved from a boarding school to a military academy and despite the resulting lack of money, he was captivated by literature until his death.

Dostoyevsky started his writing career after finishing university. He started translating literature from Frenchwhich he learnt at the boarding schoolinto Russian, and then wrote short stories. With the success of his first novel, Poor Folk, he became known throughout Saint Petersburg and Russia. Vissarion Belinsky, Alexander Herzen and others praised Poor Folks depiction of poverty, and Belinsky called it Russia's "first social novel". This success did not continue with his second novel, The Double, and other short stories published mainly in left-wing magazines. These magazines included Notes of the Fatherland and The Contemporary.

Dostoyevsky's renewed financial troubles led him to join several political circles. Because of his participation in the Petrashevsky Circle, in which he distributed and read several Belinsky articles deemed as anti-religious and anti-government, he and other members were sentenced to capital punishment. He was pardoned at the last minute, but they were imprisoned in SiberiaDostoyevsky for four years. During his detention he wrote several works, including the autobiographical The House of the Dead. A New Testament booklet, which had been given shortly before his imprisonment, and other literature obtained outside of the barracks, were the only books he read at that time.

Following his release, Dostoyevsky read a myriad of literature and gradually became interested in nationalistic and conservative philosophies and increasingly sceptical towards contemporary movementsespecially the Nihilists. Dostoyevsky wrote his most important works after his time in Siberia, including Crime and Punishment, The Idiot, The Gambler and The Brothers Karamazov. With the help of his brother Mikhail, Dostoyevsky opened two magazinesVremya and Epochin which some of his stories appeared. Following their closures, most of his works were issued in the conservative The Russian Messenger until the introduction of A Writer's Diary, which comprised most of his worksincluding essays and articles. Several drafts and plans, especially those begun during his honeymoon, were unfinished at his death.

Novels and novellas

Short stories

Articles and essays

 Diary articles

Dostoyevsky wrote 221 Diary articles (excluding short stories listed in the respective section above) within two periods. The initial 1873 works were published in The Citizen, the editor of which was Dostoyevsky, and from 1876 – 1877 the Diary was self-published. The English titles of the following list of works are extracted from Kenneth Lantz's two-volume translations.

A Writer's Diary is a collection mainly of essays and articles, which also include, for example, answers to readers, introductions, etc., making the Diaries a journal-like book written and mostly edited by Dostoyevsky.

List of initial Diary articles, issued in 1873:

"Introduction"
"Old People"
"Environment"
"Something Personal"
"Vlas"
"A Troubled Countenance"
"A Half-Letter From 'A Certain Person'"
"Apropos of the Exhibition"
"An Impersonator"
"Dreams and Musings"
"Apropos of a New Play"
"Little Picture"
"To a Teacher"
"Something about Lying"
"One of Today's Falsehoods"

Other articles and essays

Dostoyevsky wrote articles and essays outside the Diaries collection. These include the 1863 travelogue Winter Notes on Summer Impressions, in which he satirised and criticised European life. Other articles were written in response or as a criticism to a literary work, a person's view, requests to the military during the imprisonment period, announcements, notes and explanations. Some of them were written for different journals or almanacs.

Letters

Translations

Almanacs
Prankster (Зубоскал): a short, humorous almanac first mentioned on 8 October 1845 in a letter to his brother Mikhail. Nekrasov established the plan and headed it with Dostoyevsky and Grigorovich. According to Grigorovich it was censored because of the message "Prankster will laugh at anything which is laughable." Its themes are similar as Dostoyevsky's early works, such as Poor Folk and The Double; a man and his sick ambitions outlining typical characteristics of Muscovites and Peterburgians; flâneurs; etc. In a letter on 2 December 1845, Nekrasov stated that parts will appear in the 1846 release of April the First.
Peterburgian Chronicles (Петербургская летопись)
A Number of Articles about Russian Literature (Ряд статей о Русской литературе)

Poems, epigrams and limericks
"An Epigram about a Bavarian Colonel" (Епиграмма на Баварского полковника) (mid-1864): an epigram which criticises poems from A. A. Kraevsky's The Voice
"Tell Me, Why Did You Ravage It So..." (Скажи, зачем ты так разорил...) (mid-1864): begins as a three-line poem. It too mocks The Voice, specifically a brutal romance
"Describing Nothing but the Priests"  (Описывать всё сплошь одних попов) (1873): a planned epigram about Nikolay Leskov and his 1874 novel A Decayed Family, which appeared in The Russian Messenger
"Children are Dear" (Дорого стоят детишки) (1876–77): a limerick about his wife Anna included in a notebook of A Writer's Diary
"The Crash of Baymakov's Enterprise..." (Крах конторы Баймакова...) (4 December 1876): a poem about the insolvencies of two Saint Petersburg offices, Baymakova and Lurie.
"Do Not Steal, Fedul..." (Не разбойничай, Федул...) (2 December 1879): several limericks about his wife, son and daughters included in a notebook of The Brothers Karamazov
"She's All in Tears of Indignation..." (Вся в слезах негодованья...) (September – October 1868): a humorous poem written in Milan by Dostoyevsky and his wife.
"I Asked My Wife for Soap..." (Я просил жену про мыло...) (autumn 1867 or winter 1867/1868 – May): a humorous poem written in Geneva by Dostoyevsky and his wife.
"We've Been Living in Poverty for Two Generations..." (Два рода мы бедно живем...) (26 February – 6 April 1869)
"Do You, Brother, Have Any Conscience..." (Есть ли у тебя, брать, совесть...) (26 February – 6 April 1869)

Collaborative works
How Dangerous are Ambitious Dreams (Как опасно предаваться честолюбовым снам) (1846): a mixture of prose and poetry written by Dostoyevsky, Nikolay Nekrasov (the main writer) and Dmitry Grigorovich. Published on 1 April 1846 in the almanac April the First, with illustrations by artists including Pavel Fedotov and Alexander Agin. Also announced on that date
One Mission (poem). A Theme under the Name "Imperator" (Одна Мысль (поэма) — Тема под названием «Император») (October / November 1867): begins as a poem until interlineations occur. Appeared in the same notebook as The Idiot, suggesting that it is an additional text to that novel. The protagonist has similar traits as Prince Myshkin. The main influence is Mikhail Semevsky's work about the life of Ivan VI from 1740 to 1764, a part of Russkaya Starina. Dostoyevsky may have already heard of it in Geneva, where he stayed between October and November 1867. One Mission was reworked by Grigory Danilevsky and included in Milovich, which appeared in 1879 in The Russian Messenger alongside The Brothers Karamazov.
The Life of a Great Sinner (Житие великого грешника) (December 1869 – January 1870): an unfinished novel and poem. Written between December 1869 and January 1870, it was abandoned until some elements were incorporated into A Raw Youth. Similar parts of The Life of a Great Sinner were also indicated in The Possessed and The Brothers Karamazov.

Pamphlets
Fighting Nihilism with Honesty (an Officer and a Female Nihilist) (Борьба нигилизма с честностью (офицер и нигилистка)) (1864–73): a pamphlet planned since mid-1864 while working on "About a Man Who Was Eaten by a Crocodile"

Other
The Goblin (Домовой) (?): an undated, unfinished plan
The Siberian Notebook (Сибирская тетрадь) (probably 1852–3): an undated manuscript comprising 486 numbered notes written during Dostoyevsky's imprisonment in Omsk. Probably preserved by a feldsher.
A Leaping Maiden... (Расскакавшуюся деву...) (summer 1866): a two-line work written while resting in Lyublino near Moscow with his sister Vera Ivanova in mid-1866.
The Holy-Fool (The Sworn Attorney) (Юродивый (присяжный поверенный)) (late May / early September 1868): an idea connected with The Idiot. Some motives were later borrowed and incorporated in The Demons.
Stabbed to Death After the Bible (После Библии зарезал) (September / October 1869): written during The Eternal Husband. Similar motive as The Idiots, and the main character conforms to the one in The Eternal Husband. Intended to be published in The Russian Messenger instead of Zarya for financial reasons.
(?) (mid-1872): "An idea". Included in the same notebook as the last part of The Possessed, which appeared from November and December 1872 in The Russian Messenger and printed in The Citizen the next year.
(?) (13 September 1874) – "Drama in Tobolsk": about the happenings in Staraya Russa, where the Dostoyevskys planned their winter holidays since August 1874. The father of a praporshchik named Dmitry Ilynskov suddenly disappears until 10 months later when his body is found in a ditch under a house in Tobolsk in 1845. Murderer unclear. First draft of the first part of The Brothers Karamazov.
To Koslov (Козлову) (March 1875): a planned story about writer and translator Pavel Kozlov, whose stories Dostoyevky may had read in Zarya before meeting with him and his wife not later than January 1873 (probably 31 January). His stories later also appeared between 1873–4 in The Citizen.
Sorokoviny (Сороковины) (1 August 1875): included in an 1872–5 notebook with another piece about Pushkin. Work also announced on December 1877, but remained unfinished. Some thoughts were included in The Brothers Karamazov, especially in book nine, volume III–V and book eleven, volume IX.
The Dreamer (Мечтатель) (March/April 1876 – January 1877): a socio-psychological work about a "dreamer", a common theme since "White Nights".
To Nekrasov's Novella (В повесть Некрасову) (1876–77): three fragments which may had formed a complete work. First two were written in mid-1876 during the July/August and September issues of A Writer's Diary. Third fragment written around January 1877. All three may have been issued in Nekrasov's Notes of the Fatherland
Slesarek (Слесарек) (2nd half of 1876) – ?
Karl Ivanovich's History (История Карла Ивановича) (1874 or 9 March 1875): a work in which a man named Karl Ivanovich recounts history. The person's name and character were borrowed from Leo Tolstoy's Childhood (1852) and Boyhood (1854), both of which Dostoyevsky read in 1855; about the time he wrote The Raw Youth and A Writer's Diary.

Footnotes

Notes

References

External links

 
 
  List of works of Dostoyevsky
  A Writer's Diary in 15 volumes

Bibliographies by writer
Bibliographies of Russian writers
Bibliography